The Confidence Doctrine is a signature political philosophy of Xi Jinping, General Secretary of the Chinese Communist Party (CCP). It calls for CCP members, government officials, and the Chinese people to be "confident in our chosen path, confident in our guiding theories, confident in our political system, and confident in our culture." Officially, the doctrine is termed Four matters of confidence.

History 
The doctrine was first discussed at the 18th Party Congress held in November 2012 in a speech by then party General Secretary Hu Jintao, and the doctrine was termed the Three Confidences. The origin of the theory is said to be Yi Junqing, an official later disgraced for corruption who served as the head of the Compilation and Translation Bureau. Xi Jinping added a 'fourth' confidence, "confidence in our culture," in December 2014. Along with the Four Comprehensives and the Chinese Dream, it has, since 2013, become a central theme in political slogans of the CCP, often recited at official meetings, conferences, and by state-owned media.

In 2017, the 19th CCP National Congress added the Four Confidences to the party's constitution, inserting "firm confidence in its path, theory, system, and culture," along with other doctrines proposed by Xi Jinping. The Decision of the Fourth Plenary Session of the 19th Central Committee of the CCP, after expounding the "remarkable advantages" (显著优势) of China's national system and system of governance in 13 aspects, states, "These remarkable advantages are the basis for our firm confidence in the path, theory, system and culture of Socialism with Chinese characteristics."

According to several portraits of Xi by both domestic and foreign observers, Xi Jinping has a deeply held belief that the Communist Party and the institutions it has created is the best institution to govern China and the best institution to guide China's development. Throughout the period that the Communist Party was the ruling party of China, the party has constantly faced challenges and doubts, both domestically and internationally, about its continuing legitimacy to govern, and pressures for political reform. While the Communist Party has long criticized "western-style democracy and separation of powers" as unsuitable for the Chinese environment, the Confidence Doctrine introduces a novel approach to the issue by emphasizing self-confidence over the criticism of external forces.

Doctrine

Characteristics of the Four Matters of Confidence 
Four matters of confidence refer to confidence in the path, theory, system, and culture of socialism with Chinese characteristics. According to an official translation:"Confidence in its path" is confidence in the direction of development of socialism with Chinese characteristics and confidence in its future; "confidence in its theory" is confidence in the scientific nature... of the theory of socialism with Chinese characteristics; "confidence in its system" is confidence in the advanced and superior nature of the system of Chinese socialism; "confidence in its culture" is a full affirmation of the value of China's own culture and a faith in its vitality.

These four form an organic whole; they provide a complete conceptual system of socialism with Chinese characteristics.The CCP believes that China's national system and system of governance are guided by Marxism and have deep roots in Chinese culture, formed through the unique experience of the CCP and the Chinese people, and are "deeply supported by the people." To promote institution-building, the CCP believes it to be necessary to study and learn from the "useful achievements of foreign systems and civilizations, but not to copy foreign models," deviating from China's "national conditions and historical culture."

Purported advantages 
According to the theory of the CCP, China's national system and system of governance have significant advantages and are the basic basis for the "four self-confidence". According to the Decision of the Fourth Plenary Session of the 19th Central Committee of the CCP, China's national system and system of governance have remarkable advantages in 13 areas, including: the leadership of the party, political stability, ability to mobilize for major projects, flexibility and adaptation, the combination of socialism and market characteristics, increase of people's welfare and standard of living, socialist rule of law, party's leadership over the military, equality of the different nationalities, and the combination of independence and openness to the outside world.

The Chinese Communist Party believes that China's rapid economic development and long-term social stability have demonstrated the "remarkable advantages" of its national system and system of governance, namely:

 Rapid economic development: in the more than 70 years since the establishment of the PRC, and especially since reform and opening, China has experienced rapid economic development that is rare in the world, becoming the world's second largest economy, the largest manufacturing power, the largest trading power in goods and has the largest foreign exchange reserve, and entering the world's forefront in economic strength, scientific and technological strength, national defence strength and comprehensive national power. The largest and most growing middle-income group in the world has been formed. The people's well-being in the areas of employment, education, health care, housing, old age and social security has continued to improve.
 Long-term social stability: China has maintained long-term social harmony and stability, and its people live and work in peace and contentment, making it "one of the countries recognized by the international community as having the greatest sense of security."

See also 

 Ideology of the Chinese Communist Party

References

2013 in China